Patrick Joseph Burke (1921 – 14 November 1955) was an Irish Gaelic footballer who played for club side Milltown/Castlemaine and at inter-county level with the Kerry senior football team.

Career

Burke first played Gaelic football with the Milltown/Castlemaine club and made his first appearance at inter-county level with Kerry during the 1946 Munster Championship. He won a  Munster Championship medal that season, however, the highlight of his brief inter-county career was the 1946 All-Ireland final replay defeat of Roscommon.

Personal life and death

Burke was born in Milltown, County Kerry and worked as a health inspector. His sporting career was cut short by illness and he died at the age of 34 on 14 November 1955.

Honours

Kerry
All-Ireland Senior Football Championship: 1946
Munster Senior Football Championship: 1946

References

1921 births
1955 deaths
Milltown/Castlemaine Gaelic footballers
Kerry inter-county Gaelic footballers
Munster inter-provincial Gaelic footballers